George S. Eichhorn (born December 1, 1954) was a Republican member of the Iowa House of Representatives from 2001 until 2007. He was defeated by Democrat McKinley Bailey in the 2006 election.

He ran for the United States Senate in 2008.

In 2010 he ran for Iowa Secretary of State.

Notes

References
Iowa Legislature bio of Eichhorn

Living people
Republican Party members of the Iowa House of Representatives
Place of birth missing (living people)
1954 births